John P. Moran (June 17, 1857 – December 6, 1916) was for three years a member of the Los Angeles, California Common Council, beginning in 1879. He was council president for two years.

Family

Mrs. Mary Moran, who lived at East Ninth Street and Maple Avenue, was the head of the family. She died on December 11, 1894, and was survived by her son, John P., and two daughters, Mrs. Mary A. Dennison and Mrs. Catherine O'Connell.

Community activities

In the 1880s, Moran was a member of the Los Angeles County Democratic Central Committee. He was also the president of the Young Men's Institute in Los Angeles, and was grand first vice president of the California unit of the organization.

In 1925, Moran was one of the organizers of a social and historical group called the Sons of Los Angeles, restricted in membership to those born in Los Angeles County before 1881.

Common Council

Moran was elected to the Common Council—the legislative arm of the city—in December 1879 and served until December 1882. He was president of the council for two years.

Administrator

In the 1890s, Moran was the center of a legal dispute over the validity of the will of one Bridget Wilson, who had amassed a considerable fortune—some $300,000—since she immigrated to the United States from Ireland. While the matter was tied up in litigation, Moran was appointed administrator of her estate, but when it came time to settle, it was alleged that he was short by some $9,300. The suit was settled in compromise for $3,066.

References

Access to the Los Angeles Times links may require the use of a library card.

Further reading

 Harris Newmark, Sixty Years in Southern California, page 363.

Los Angeles Common Council (1850–1889) members
19th-century American politicians
California Democrats
1857 births
1916 deaths